The following is a list of all awards which the Australian drama, Blue Heelers, has won or been nominated for.

Logie Awards

Australian Film Institute (AFI) Awards

People's Choice Awards

Other awards
1997
AWGIE (Australian Writers' Guild) Awards
 Winner – Television (Series): Blue Heelers: "Ep. 133: Reports of Damage And Loss" — John Banas
2002
AWGIE (Australian Writers' Guild) Awards
 Nominee – Television (Series): Blue Heelers: "Ep. 177: Letting Go" — Tony Morphett
2006
Australian Screen Editors' Awards
 Nominee – Nathan Wild

References

Blue Heelers
Blue Heelers